The 1932–33 season was the 27th year of football played by Dundee United, and covers the period from 1 July 1932 to 30 June 1933.

Match results
Dundee United played a total of 37 matches during the 1932–33 season.

Legend

All results are written with Dundee United's score first.
Own goals in italics

Second Division

Scottish Cup

References

Dundee United F.C. seasons
Dundee United